Agdistis obstinata is a moth in the family Pterophoridae. It is known from South Africa, Kenya, Tanzania, Uganda, Saudi Arabia, Yemen and Ethiopia.

References

Agdistinae
Moths described in 1920
Moths of Africa
Insects of Uganda
Moths of the Middle East
Insects of Ethiopia
Insects of Tanzania